, also known as , , or , is a disembodied spirit or ghost in Japanese popular belief and fiction that leaves the body of a living person and subsequently haunts other people or places, sometimes across great distances.

Summary
The popular belief that the human spirit (or soul) can escape from the body has been around since early times, with eyewitness accounts and experiences (hauntings, possessions, out-of-body experience) reported in anecdotal and fictional writings.  of the living are said to inflict  upon the subject or subjects of their vengeance by means of transforming into their  form. It is believed that if a sufficient grudge is held, all or part of the perpetrator's soul leaves the body, appearing in front of the victim to harm or curse them, a concept not so dissimilar from the evil eye. The  has even made its way into Buddhist scriptures, where they are described as "living spirits" who, if angered, might bring about curses, even just before their death. Possession is another means by which the Ikiryō are commonly believed to be capable of inflicting harm, the possessed person thought to be unaware of this process. However, according to mythology, the  does not necessarily act out of spite or vengefulness, and stories are told of the  who bears no grudge, or poses no real threat. In recorded examples, the spirit sometimes takes possession of another person's body for motives other than vengeance, such as love and infatuation (for example the Matsutōya ghost below). A person's  may also leave the body (often very shortly before death) to manifest its presence around loved ones, friends and/or acquaintances.

Classical literature

In the Heian period, a human soul leaving a body and drifting away is described by the old verb  meaning "departure". In The Tale of Genji, the mentally troubled Kashiwagi fears that his soul may be found wandering, and requests that last rites are performed on his body to stop his soul from escaping if this should happen.

 contains the tale "How the  Spirit of Omi Province Came and Killed a Man of the Capital". In the tale, a commoner encounters a noblewoman and guides her to the house of a certain  in the capital. Upon reaching the house the lady vanishes, though the gates remain shut. Wailing noises are heard inside the house. The guide later seeks out the lady's house in Ōmi Province. There a woman speaks to him through blinds, acknowledging the man's services that day, and showers him with gifts of silk cloth.

The  can also possess the object of its infatuation, who is neither rival nor enemy. The , a tale allegedly based on events that occurred during Kyōhō 14 or 15 (1729–1730), a Kyoto merchant named  had a teenaged son named Matsunosuke possessed by the spirit of two women who loved him, and who tormented the boy's conscience. On occasion, he would be suspended in mid-air, engaging in conversation as if the girls were present before his eyes, the 's words being spoken through the boy's lips. Finally the family sought help from a renowned priest named Zōkai. The priest successfully exorcised the boy and cured his condition, but rumors had already spread regarding the incident.

The horror story collection , published Kanbun 3, or 1663, includes a tale of a woman whose  assumed the shape of her severed head. One night, a man traveling towards Kyoto arrives at place called Sawaya in Kita-no-shō, Echizen Province (now Fukui City), where he mistakedly thinks he saw a chicken fly from the base of a nearby stone tower on to the road. The imagined chicken turns out to be (or has transformed into) a lively severed head of a woman. When the face grins at him, he attacks with a sword, and chases it to a home in the capital of the province. Inside the house, the housewife awakes from a nightmare being chased by a man brandishing a blade. The wandering head was, according to the title, the woman's , or her wayward thoughts and obsessions. The woman later turns Buddhist nun to repent for her sins.

Folk legends

Regional near-death spirits
Sightings of  belonging to those whose deaths are imminent have been recorded from all over Japan. Stories abound of spirits that materialize (or otherwise manifest their presence) to someone dear to them, such as immediate family. The recipient of the visit experiencing a metaphysical foreshadowing of this person's death, before any tangible news of bereavement arrives.

In the tradition of the Nishitsugaru District, Aomori Prefecture, the souls of the person/s on the brink of death are called , and believed to depart from the body and walk around, sometimes making noises like that of the door sliding open.

According to Yanagita,  is the equivalent term to the Senboku District, Akita region. Yanagita defines this as the ability of certain persons to traverse the world in their  form. Such individuals are purported to have voluntary control of this ability, in contrast to those who are only temporarily capable of tapping into such a state as a precursor to their death.

The temple was believed to be the soul's final resting grounds, where one finds a place amongst their ancestors.

Soul flames
 
However, a "soul flame" from a person who is near death is not considered unusual, with the traditional conception among Japanese being that the soul escapes the body within a short phase (several days) either before or after death.

The subject worked at the town office of Tōno, Iwate, and one night, he reported seeing an  emerge from a stable and into the house's entrance where it was "flying around". He claimed to have chased it with a broom, and trapped it beneath a washbasin. A while after, he was rushed out to see his sick uncle on the brink of death, but he made sure to release the fireball from its trapping. He soon learned that his uncle had only just died, but  his uncle came back to life again, enough so to accuse the nephew of chasing him with a broom and capturing him. Similarly, the folklore archives of Umedoi, Mie Prefecture (now part of Inabe) tells a tale about a band of men who, late in the night, spotted and chased a fireball into a sake warehouse, waking a maid who was asleep inside. The maid later professed to being "pursued by many men and fleeing" to take refuge in the warehouse.

Ikiryō as an illness

During the Edo period, there was a belief that there was a condition called , whereby the soul would not just separate from the body, but assume the shape and appearance of the sufferer.

The identical double might be seen by the sufferer or be witnessed by others, and can be classed as a doppelgänger phenomenon.

Similar activity or phenomena
The  is, when one, in the hour of the ox (1 am to 3 am), strikes a nail in a sacred tree, and thus becomes an  while alive, and using these  powers, would inflict curses and calamity upon a rival.

See also
 Astral projection
 Out of body experience
 Doppelgänger
 Eidolon
 Fetch (folklore)
 Soul

Explanatory notes

Citations

References

Chapter 1 , pp. 11–36
Chapter 2 , pp. 37–62
Chapter 3 , pp. 63–98
Chapter 4 , pp. 100–125
 

Buddhist folklore
Japanese ghosts
Japanese folklore